The Kansas Historical Quarterly (1931–1977) was an academic journal published by the Kansas State Historical Society in Topeka, Kansas. The journal focused on the history of Kansas. Editors-in-chief included James C. Malin, Kirke Mechem, and Nyle H. Miller. It replaced the Society's earlier publication, Kansas Historical Collections (1875–1928), and was succeeded by Kansas History: A Journal of the Central Plains (est. 1978).

References

Further reading
 Kansas Historical Quarterly, (Internet Archive) v.1–29, 1931–1963.

Publications established in 1931
History of Kansas
English-language journals
Defunct journals of the United States
Publications disestablished in 1977
History of the United States journals
Magazines published in Kansas
1931 establishments in Kansas
1977 disestablishments in Kansas